Michael Myers is a fictional character from the Halloween series of slasher films. He first appears in John Carpenter's Halloween (1978) as a young boy who murders his elder sister, Judith Myers. Fifteen years later, he returns home to Haddonfield, Illinois, to murder more teenagers. In the original Halloween, the adult Michael Myers, referred to as The Shape in the closing credits, was portrayed by Nick Castle for most of the film and substituted by Tony Moran in the final scene where Michael's face is revealed. The character was created by John Carpenter and has appeared in thirteen films, as well as novels, multiple video games, and several comic books.

The character is the primary antagonist in all films except Halloween III: Season of the Witch, which is not connected in continuity to the rest of the films. Since Castle and Moran put on the mask in the original film, six people have stepped into the same role. Castle, George P. Wilbur, Tyler Mane, and James Jude Courtney are the only actors to have portrayed Michael Myers more than once, with Mane and Courtney being the only actors to do so in consecutive films. Michael Myers is characterized as pure evil, both directly in the films, by the filmmakers who created and developed the character over nine films, and by random participants in a survey. In the first two films, Michael wears a Captain Kirk mask that is painted white. The mask, which was made from a cast of William Shatner's face, was originally used in the 1975 horror film The Devil's Rain.

Appearances
Michael Myers appears in all of the Halloween films excluding the standalone Halloween III: Season of the Witch, although he is briefly seen on a television advertisement for the original film. Myers has also appeared in expanded universe novels and comic books.

Films

Michael Myers made his first appearance in the 1978 film Halloween. At the beginning of Halloween, a six-year-old Michael murders his teenage sister Judith on Halloween night in 1963. Fifteen years later, he escapes Smith's Grove Sanitarium and returns to his hometown of Haddonfield, Illinois, where he stalks a teenage babysitter named Laurie Strode, while his psychiatrist, Dr. Sam Loomis, attempts to track him down. After murdering three of Laurie's friends, Michael attacks her as well. She fends him off long enough for Loomis to arrive and shoot Michael six times, knocking him off a balcony; when Loomis goes to check the body, he finds that Michael has disappeared. Halloween II (1981) picks up directly where the original ended. Michael follows Laurie to the local hospital and kills the staff one by one. Loomis discovers that Laurie is Michael's younger sister and rushes to the hospital to find them. Laurie shoots Michael in the eyes, and Loomis blows up the operating theater while Laurie escapes. Michael emerges from the explosion, engulfed in flames, before finally collapsing.

Michael does not appear again until Halloween 4: The Return of Michael Myers in 1988, which picks up ten years after the events of Halloween II. Michael has been in a coma since the explosion. He awakens when he learns Laurie has died in a car accident but has a nine-year-old daughter, Jamie Lloyd. Returning to Haddonfield, he causes a citywide blackout and massacres the town's police force and some civilians before being shot by the state police and falling down a mine shaft. Halloween 5: The Revenge of Michael Myers begins immediately after the fourth film ends, with Michael escaping the mine shaft and being nursed back to health by a local hermit. One year later, he kills the hermit and returns to Haddonfield to find Jamie again, chasing her through his childhood home in a trap set by Loomis. He is eventually subdued by Loomis and taken to the local police station, but a mysterious "Man in Black" kills the officers and frees him. 

Halloween: The Curse of Michael Myers takes place six years after the events of the previous film. Jamie, now fifteen, has been kidnapped and impregnated by a druid cult led by the Man in Black, later revealed to be Dr. Terence Wynn, Loomis' friend and colleague from Smith's Grove. After giving birth, Jamie escapes with her baby, only to be killed by Michael. The baby is found by Tommy Doyle, whom Laurie babysat in the original film. Upon returning to Haddonfield once more, Michael kills relatives of Laurie's adoptive family, who are living in his childhood home. He is revealed to be inflicted with the Curse of Thorn, which drives him to kill his family. Wynn and his cult kidnap Jamie's baby, as well as Kara Strode and her son Danny. Loomis and Tommy follow them to Smith's Grove, where Michael ultimately turns against the cult and slaughters them all. Tommy injects Michael with chemicals and beats him unconscious. Loomis stays behind as the others escape. Michael's mask is shown on the ground as Loomis screams in the distance, leaving their fates unknown.

Ignoring the events of the previous three films, Halloween H20: 20 Years Later establishes that Michael has been missing since the hospital explosion twenty years ago. Laurie Strode has faked her death and gone into hiding in California under an assumed name. She is the headmistress of a private boarding school and has a teenage son named John. Michael tracks them down and murders John's friends. After getting her son to safety, Laurie decides to face Michael and ultimately decapitates him. Halloween: Resurrection, which picks up three years after H20, retcons Michael's death, establishing that the man Laurie decapitated was a paramedic whom Michael had attacked and swapped clothes with before escaping. Michael tracks down an institutionalized Laurie and kills her. He returns to Haddonfield, where one year later, he kills a group of college students filming an internet reality show inside his childhood home. Contestant Sara Moyer and show producer Freddie Harris escape after electrocuting Michael. Michael's body and the bodies of his victims are then taken to the morgue. As the medical examiner begins to inspect Michael's body, he awakens.

The series was rebooted in 2007 with Rob Zombie's Halloween. The film establishes from the beginning that Michael and Laurie are siblings, and has an increased focus on Michael's childhood: a ten-year-old Michael is shown killing animals and suffering emotional abuse from Judith and his mother's boyfriend Ronnie, both of whom he later murders, along with a boy named Wesley Rhoades who was bullying him. After being committed to Smith's Grove, Michael takes up the hobby of creating papier-mâché masks and receives unsuccessful therapy from Dr. Sam Loomis. Michael's mother Deborah commits suicide after witnessing him killing a nurse. As an adult, Michael returns to Haddonfield to reunite with Laurie, the only person he has ever loved. However, Laurie has no memory of Michael and is terrified of him, ultimately shooting him in the head in self-defense after he kills her friends and adoptive parents.

Zombie's story is continued in the sequel, Halloween II, which picks up right where the remake leaves off and then jumps ahead one year. Here, Michael is presumed dead but resurfaces after a vision of Deborah informs him that he must track Laurie down so that they can "come home." In the film, Michael and Laurie have a mental link, with the two sharing visions of their mother. During the film's climax, Laurie kills Michael by stabbing him repeatedly in the chest and face with his knife, with the final scene suggesting that she has taken on her brother's psychosis as she dons his mask.

Michael's continuity is again rebooted in the 2018 film Halloween, which is a direct sequel to the original film in which Michael and Laurie are not siblings. It is established that after being shot by Loomis, Michael fled to his childhood home and was arrested by the Haddonfield police. After forty years at Smith's Grove Sanitarium, he escapes again and returns to Haddonfield for another killing spree. He again encounters Laurie, who has been living in fear of his return. She shoots off two of his fingers and, with the help of her daughter Karen and granddaughter Allyson, traps him in the basement of her house, which they then set on fire. Michael is heard breathing at the end of the credits, indicated that he survived.

Halloween Kills is a direct sequel to the 2018 film in which Michael escapes the burning house and resumes his killing spree. In response, the enraged townspeople form a mob to hunt him down. While the mob proves to be unnecessarily destructive, they do eventually swarm him and seemingly kill him. As they attempt to confirm he's really dead, Michael rises again and massacres them all. He returns to his childhood home, where he kills Karen as well. 

Halloween Ends (2022) picks up four years after its predecessor, revealing that Michael went into hiding after killing Karen. Now in a badly weakened condition, Michael inhabits a sewer cavern where a troubled young man named Corey Cunningham, who is dating Allyson, encounters him. Corey begins helping Michael kill people and starts to manifest the same evil. He eventually steals Michael's mask and murders several people who wronged him. He also goes after Laurie, but is shot down a stairwell. Michael arrives to retrieve his mask and kills Corey. Laurie pins Michael to a table and slits his throat, but he chokes her with the last of his strength. Allyson intervenes and breaks Michael's arm, allowing Laurie to fatally slice his wrist. A town-wide procession takes place, where everyone watches Laurie dispose of Michael's corpse in an industrial shredder, ending his rampage once and for all.

Literature
Michael Myers made his literary debut in October 1979 when Curtis Richards released a novelization of the film. The book follows the events of the film but includes references to the festival of Samhain.  A prologue provides a possible explanation for Michael's murderous impulses, telling the story of Enda, a disfigured Celtic teenager who butchers the Druid princess Deirdre and her lover as revenge for rejecting him; the king subsequently has his shaman curse Enda's soul for walking the earth reliving his crime for eternity.  It is later revealed that Michael Myers suffers nightmares about Enda and Deirdre, as did Michael's great-grandfather before shooting two people to death at a Halloween harvest dance in the 1890s.  The novel shows Michael's childhood in more detail; his mother voices concern over her son's anti-social behavior shortly before he murders Judith. Dr. Loomis notices the boy's effortless control and manipulation of the staff and patients at Smith's Grove during his incarceration. Later in the story, Michael's stalking of Laurie and her friends is depicted as more explicitly sexual than was apparent in the film, with several references to him having an erection. Michael returned to the world of literature with the 1981 adaptation of Halloween II written by Jack Martin; it was published alongside the first film sequel, with the novel following the film events, with an additional victim, a reporter, added to the novel. The final novelization to feature Michael was Halloween IV, released October 1988. The novel was written by Nicholas Grabowsky, and like the previous adaptations, follows the events of Halloween 4: The Return of Michael Myers.

Over a four-month period, Berkley Books published three young adult novels written by Kelly O'Rourke; the novels are original stories created by O'Rourke, with no direct continuity with the films. The first, released on October 1, 1997, titled The Scream Factory, follows a group of friends who set up a haunted house attraction in the basement of Haddonfield City Hall, only to be stalked and killed by Michael Myers while they are there. The Old Myers Place is the second novel, released 1 December 1997, and focuses on Mary White, who moves into the Myers house with her family and takes up residence in Judith Myers' former bedroom. Michael returns home and begins stalking and attacking Mary and her friends. O'Rourke's final novel, The Mad House, was released on 1 February 1998. The Mad House features a young girl, Christine Ray, who joins a documentary film crew that travels to haunted locations; they are currently headed to Smith Grove Mental Hospital. The crew is quickly confronted by Michael Myers.

The character's first break into comics came with a series of comics published by Brian Pulido's Chaos! Comics. The first, simply titled Halloween, was intended to be a one-issue special, but eventually two sequels spawned: Halloween II: The Blackest Eyes and Halloween III: The Devil's Eyes. All of the stories were written by Phil Nutman, with Daniel Farrands—writer for Halloween: The Curse of Michael Myers—assisting on the first issue; David Brewer and Justiniano worked on the illustrations. Tommy Doyle is the main protagonist in each of the issues, focusing on his attempts to kill Michael Myers. The first issue includes backstory on Michael's childhood, while the third picks up after the events of the film Halloween H20.

In 2003, Michael appeared in the self-published comic One Good Scare, written by Stefan Hutchinson and illustrated by Peter Fielding. The main character in the comic is Lindsey Wallace, the young girl who first saw Michael Myers alongside Tommy Doyle in the original 1978 film. Hutchinson wanted to bring the character back to his roots, and away from the "lumbering Jason-clone" the film sequels had made him. On 25 July 2006, as an insert inside the DVD release of Halloween: 25 Years of Terror, the comic book Halloween: Autopsis was released. Written by Stefan Hutchinson and artwork by Marcus Smith and Nick Dismas, the story is about a photographer assigned to take pictures of Michael Myers. As the photographer, Carter, follows Dr. Loomis; he begins to take on Loomis's obsession himself, until finally meeting Michael Myers in person, which results in his death.

In 2008, Devil's Due Publishing began releasing more Halloween comic books, starting with a four issue mini series, titled Halloween: Nightdance.  Written by Stefan Hutchinson, Nightdance takes place in Russellville, and follows Michael's obsession with Lisa Thomas, a girl who reminds him of his sister Judith.  Lisa is afraid of the dark after Michael trapped her in a basement for days, and years later, he starts sending her disturbing, childlike drawings and murdering those around her on Halloween.  Meanwhile, Ryan Nichols is hunting Michael down after seeing him attack and kidnap his wife.  In the end, Michael frames Ryan for the murders and buries Lisa alive.  Hutchinson explains that Nightdance was an attempt to escape the dense continuity of the film series and recreate the tone of the 1978 film; Michael becomes inexplicably fixated on Lisa, just as he did with Laurie in the original Halloween, before the sequels established that a sibling bond was actually his motivation for stalking her. Included in the Nightdance trade paperback is the short prose story Charlie, which features Charlie Bowles, a Russellville serial killer who taps into the same evil force which motivates Michael Myers.  To celebrate the anniversary of the Halloween series, Devil's Due released a one-shot comic entitled Halloween: 30 Years of Terror in August 2008, written by Hutchinson. An anthology collection inspired by John Carpenter's original film, Michael appears in various stories, tampering with Halloween candy, decapitating a beauty queen, tormenting Laurie Strode, and killing a school teacher.

Concept and creation

Characterization

'Michael Myers' was the real-life name of the head of the now-dissolved British company Miracle Films. Myers, after meeting producer Irwin Yablans, distributed John Carpenter's previous film Assault on Precinct 13 in England in 1977. His name was chosen as a tribute to this success. A common characterization of Michael Myers is that he is pure evil. John Carpenter has described the character as "almost a supernatural force—a force of nature. An evil force that's loose," a force that is "unkillable". Nicholas Rogers elaborates, "Myers is depicted as a mythic, elusive bogeyman, one of superhuman strength who bullets cannot kill, stab wounds, or fire." Carpenter's inspiration for the "evil" that Michael would embody came when he was in college. While on a class trip at a mental institution in Kentucky, Carpenter visited "the most serious, mentally ill patients". Among those patients was a young boy around 12 to 13 years old. The boy gave a "schizophrenic stare", "a real evil stare", which Carpenter found "unsettling", "creepy", and "completely insane". Carpenter's experience would inspire the characterization that Loomis would give of Michael to Sheriff Brackett in the original film. Debra Hill has stated the scene where Michael kills a German Shepherd was done to illustrate how he is "really evil and deadly".

The ending scene of Michael being shot six times, and then disappearing after falling off the balcony, was meant to make the audience's imaginations run wild. Carpenter tried to keep the audience guessing as to who Michael Myers really is—he is gone, and everywhere at the same time; he is more than human; he may be supernatural, and no one knows how he got that way. To Carpenter, keeping the audience guessing was better than explaining away the character with "he's cursed by some..." For Josh Hartnett, who portrayed John Tate in Halloween H20, "it's that abstract, it's easier for me to be afraid of it. You know, someone who just kind of appears and, you know [mimics stabbing noise from Psycho] instead of an actual human who you think you can talk to. And no remorse, it's got no feelings, that's the most frightening, definitely." Richard Schickel, film critic for TIME, felt Michael was "irrational" and "really angry about something", having what Schickel referred to as "a kind of primitive, obsessed intelligence". Schickel considered this the "definition of a good monster", by making the character appear "less than human", but having enough intelligence "to be dangerous".

Dominique Othenin-Girard attempted to have audiences "relate to 'Evil', to Michael Myers' 'ill' side". Girard wanted Michael to appear "more human [...] even vulnerable, with contradicting feelings inside of him". He illustrated these feelings with a scene where Michael removes his mask and sheds a tear. Girard explains, "Again, to humanize him, to give him a tear. If Evil or in this case our boogeyman knows pain, or love or demonstrates a feeling of regret; he becomes even scarier to me if he pursues his malefic action. He shows an evil determination beyond his feelings. Dr. Loomis tries to reach his emotional side several times in [Halloween 5]. He thinks he could cure Michael through his feelings."

Daniel Farrands, the writer of The Curse of Michael Myers, describes the character as a "sexual deviant". According to him, the way Michael follows girls around and watches them contains a subtext of repressed sexuality. Farrands theorizes that, as a child, Michael became fixated on the murder of his sister Judith, and for his own twisted reasons felt the need to repeat that action over and over again, finding a sister-like figure in Laurie who excited him sexually. He also believes that by making Laurie Michael's literal sister, the sequels took away from the simplicity and relatability of the original Halloween. Nevertheless, when writing Curse, Farrands was tasked with creating a mythology for Michael which defined his motives and why he could not be killed. He says, "He can't just be a man anymore, he's gone beyond that. He's mythical. He's supernatural. So, I took it from that standpoint that there's something else driving him. A force that goes beyond that five senses that have infected this boy's soul and now are driving him." As the script developed and more people became involved, Farrands admits that the film went too far in explaining Michael Myers and that he himself was not completely satisfied with the finished product.

Michael does not speak in the films; the first time audiences ever hear his voice is in the 2007 Rob Zombie reboot. Michael speaks as a child at the beginning of the film, but while in Smith's Grove he stops talking completely. Rob Zombie originally planned to have the adult Michael speak to Laurie in the film's finale, simply saying his childhood nickname for her, "Boo". Zombie explained that this version was not used because he was afraid having the character talk at that point would demystify him too much and because the act of Michael handing Laurie the photograph of them together was enough.

Describing aspects of Michael Myers that he wanted to explore in the comic book Halloween: Night dance, writer Stefan Hutchinson mentions the character's "bizarre and dark sense of humor", as seen when he wore a sheet over his head to trick a girl into thinking he was her boyfriend, and the satisfaction he gets from scaring the characters before he murders them, such as letting Laurie know he is stalking her. Hutchinson feels there is a perverse nature to Michael's actions: "see the difference between how he watches and pursues women to men". He also suggests that Michael Myers' hometown of Haddonfield is the cause of his behavior, likening his situation to that of Jack the Ripper, citing Myers as a "product of normal suburbia - all the repressed emotion of fake Norman Rockwell smiles". Hutchinson describes Michael as a "monster of abjection". When asked his opinion of Rob Zombie's expansion on Michael's family life, Hutchinson says that explaining why Michael does what he does "[reduces] the character". That being said, Hutchinson explores the nature of evil in the short story Charlie—included in the Halloween Night dance trade paperback—and says that Michael Myers spent 15 years "attuning himself to this force to the point where he is, as Loomis says, 'pure evil'". Night dance artist Tim Seeley describes the character's personality in John Carpenter's 1978 film as "a void", which allows the character to be more open to interpretation than the later sequels allowed him. He surmises that Michael embodies a part of everyone; a part people are afraid will one day "snap and knife someone", which lends to the fear that Michael creates onscreen. He was further characterized in the video game Dead by Daylight as "infused with a distilled and pure form of evil... For Michael, he had to kill to find some inner peace. As he took his sister's life, the police found a silent boy dressed as a clown at the scene. Sending Michael to a mental institution was a feeble attempt to save the child. Unsuccessful therapy and nightly screams just made him even more  and deranged."

In 2005, a study was conducted by the Media Psychology Lab of California State University, Los Angeles on the psychological appeal of movie monsters—vampires, Freddy Krueger, Frankenstein's monster, Jason Voorhees, Godzilla, Chucky, King Kong, the Alien, and the shark from Jaws—which surveyed 1,166 people nationwide (United States), with ages ranging from 16 to 91. It was published in the Journal of Media Psychology. In the survey, Michael was considered the "embodiment of pure evil"; compared to the other characters, Michael Myers was rated the highest. Michael was characterized as lending to the understanding of insanity, being ranked second to Hannibal Lecter in this category; he also placed first as the character who shows audiences the "dark side of human nature". He was rated second in the category "monster enjoys killing" by the participants, and believed to have "superhuman strength". Michael was rated highest among the characters in the "monster is an outcast" category.

John Carpenter, serving as an executive producer and creative consultant for the 2018 sequel to Halloween (1978), expressed his disagreement with Rob Zombie's portrayal of the character: "I thought that he took away the mystique of the story by explaining too much about [Michael Myers]. I don't care about that. He's supposed to be a force of nature. He's supposed to be almost supernatural." Co-writer Danny McBride felt that previous sequels had made Michael less scary by giving him an inhuman level of invulnerability, preferring to humanize the character: "I think we're just trying to strip it down and just take it back to what was so good about the original... I want to be scared by something that I really think could happen. I think it's much more horrifying to be scared by someone standing in the shadows while you're taking the trash out as opposed to someone who can't be killed pursuing you."

History of the mask
In the documentary Halloween' Unmasked 2000 it is revealed that Michael almost had an entirely different face. The first mask considered was an Emmett Kelly clown mask that the crew had put frizzy red hair on. Ultimately, it was decided that the mask did not have the "creepy and unsettling atmosphere" they were looking for with Michael. The second mask considered was a modified James T. Kirk mask that had the eyes opened up and the skin painted white. After modification, this mask captured the blank and emotionless look they wanted.

In popular culture

In Robot Chicken's nineteenth episode, "That Hurts Me", Michael Myers (voiced by Seth Green) appears as a housemate of "Horror Movie Big Brother", alongside fellow horror movie killers Jason Voorhees, Ghostface, Freddy Krueger, Pinhead, and Leatherface. Myers is evicted from the house, and takes off his mask to reveal himself to be the comedian Mike Myers, and utters his Austin Powers catchphrase, "I feel randy, baby, yeah!" He then proceeds to kill the host. Michael appeared on 25 April 2008 episode of Ghost Whisperer, starring Jennifer Love Hewitt, titled "Horror Show". Here, a spirit communicates with Hewitt's character by placing her in scenes from the deceased's favorite horror movies, and one of the scenes involved Michael Myers. The Cold Case episode "Bad Night" has the main characters reopening a 1978 murder case after new evidence indicates the victim was killed by a mentally disturbed man who, after seeing Halloween in theatres, went on a killing spree dressed as Michael. Michael Myers makes a cameo appearance in Rob Zombie's The Haunted World of El Superbeasto, released on 22 September 2009. Michael Myers appears in the DLC pack for the video game Call of Duty: Ghosts, Onslaught, as a playable character. Myers also makes a playable appearance in the Halloween chapter of the video game Dead by Daylight, alongside Laurie Strode. He also made cameos in a film within the film within a film Stab 8 in the 2022 film Scream, portrayed by co-director Matt Bettinelli-Olpin.

In one of the various merchandises to feature the character, Michael Myers made his video game debut with the 1983 Atari video game Halloween. The game is rare to find, often being played on emulators. No characters from the films are specifically named, with the goal of the game focusing on the player, who is a babysitter, protecting children from a "homicidal maniac [who] has escaped from a mental institution". Michael was one of several horror icons to be included in the 2009 version of Universal Studios Hollywood's Halloween Horror Nights event, as a part of a maze entitled Halloween: The Life and Crimes of Michael Myers Pop artist Eric Millikin created a large mosaic portrait of Michael Myers out of Halloween candy and spiders as part of his "Totally Sweet" series in 2013. In 2018, Spirit Halloween released a lifesize animated Michael Myers prop to coincide with the 2018 film.

See also
Boogeyman

References

External links
Halloween: Nightdance scribe Stefan Hutchinson interviewed at ComiXology.com
Official site of the Halloween series

Child characters in film
Fictional characters from Illinois
Fictional characters with psychiatric disorders
Fictional characters with superhuman strength
Fictional hermits
Fictional knife-fighters
Fictional mass murderers
Fictional melee weapons practitioners
Fictional monsters
Fictional murderers of children
Fictional rampage and spree killers
Fictional sororicides
Fictional stalkers
Film characters introduced in 1978
Halloween (franchise) characters
Male horror film villains
Slasher film antagonists
Fictional prisoners and detainees
Film supervillains
Fictional mute characters